HCD or hcd may refer to:

Science and technology
 Higher-energy collisional dissociation, a mass spectrometry technique
 Hectocandela (hcd), a unit of luminous intensity
 Host controller driver, for a Host controller interface (USB, Firewire)
 Human-centered design

Other uses
 HC Davos, a Swiss ice hockey club 
 California Department of Housing and Community Development, US